Linda Johnson-Blair (born 20 June 1971) is a Canadian speed skater. She competed at the 1994 Winter Olympics and the 1998 Winter Olympics.

References

External links
 

1971 births
Living people
Canadian female speed skaters
Olympic speed skaters of Canada
Speed skaters at the 1994 Winter Olympics
Speed skaters at the 1998 Winter Olympics
People from Fort St. John, British Columbia
20th-century Canadian women